Nicola Ferrari (born 14 September 1989) is an Italian footballer who plays for  club Casertana.

Biography

Sassuolo

Sassuolo (youth)
Born in Magreta, Formigine, Emilia–Romagna, Ferrari started his professional career with U.S. Sassuolo Calcio. He played for Sassuolo's reserve from ca. March 2006 and spent  seasons for Sampdoria's reserve in Campionato Nazionale Primavera from January 2008.

Sassuolo (first team)
Before he left Sassuolo, Ferrari made his professional debut on 16 December 2007 and also played the next two game. He earned a call-up to represent Serie C1/A against Serie C1/B, which the team won the tournament.

Sampdoria (loan)
N.Ferari scored 4 goals in 7 games for Sampdoria reserve in 2007–08 season, as joint-third scorer of the team (along with Guido Marilungo and Stefano Scappini), behind Salvatore Foti (8 goals in half season) and Moussa Diarra (5 goals). However, he did not play any game in the playoff (but Gabriel Ferrari did) except the final. N.Ferrari was the second top-scorer of Sampdoria reserve in 2008–09 season, behind Marilungo. That season Sampdoria was eliminated in the postseason playoffs in the round 16 (first round) by Palermo. The teams draw 3–3 in aggregate but Palermo had more away goal. Ferrari scored once in these three goals. Ferrari also scored 4 goals for the runner-up of 2009 Torneo di Viareggio.

Lega Pro clubs
Since 2009 Ferrari was farmed to Lega Pro clubs in co-ownership deal, namely Viareggio (swap with Alessio Cristiani), Fano (for €500; €10,000 bought back), South Tyrol (for €500), Foligno and Aprilia. Ferrari only scored regularly in the Lega Pro Second Division, the fourth highest level of Italy, for Manfredonia (January–June 2010), Fano (July 2010–June 2011) and Aprilia (July 2012–June 2013). In June 2013 Aprilia acquired Ferrari outright for free.

In January 2014 he was signed by Tuttocuoio.

Serie D
On 16 September 2014 he was signed by Correggese.

Before the 2018–19 season, he joined Mantova.

On 7 July 2022, Ferrari signed with Casertana.

Honours
 Serie C1: 2008 (Sassuolo)
 Supercoppa Primavera (Sampdoria reserve)
 Campionato Nazionale Primavera: 2008 (Sampdoria reserve)
 Serie C1 U21 Tournament: 2008 (Serie C1/A)

References

External links
 Nicola Ferrari at aic.Football.it 
 Nicola Ferrari at TuttoCalciatori.net 

1989 births
Living people
Sportspeople from the Province of Modena
Footballers from Emilia-Romagna
Italian footballers
Association football forwards
U.S. Sassuolo Calcio players
U.C. Sampdoria players
F.C. Esperia Viareggio players
Manfredonia Calcio players
Alma Juventus Fano 1906 players
F.C. Südtirol players
A.S.D. Città di Foligno 1928 players
F.C. Aprilia Racing Club players
A.C. Tuttocuoio 1957 San Miniato players
S.S.D. Correggese Calcio 1948 players
A.C. Mestre players
A.C. Delta Calcio Rovigo players
Mantova 1911 players
U.S. Folgore Caratese A.S.D. players
Forlì F.C. players
S.S.D. Sanremese Calcio players
S.S.C. Giugliano players
Casertana F.C. players
Serie C players
Serie D players